Aktar Wahed (Arabic : أكتر واحد ), is a studio album by Amr Diab, and was released in 2001 following the success of the previous album Tamally Maak, it contains 10 tracks, as the head of the album was "Wala Ala Balo". The album received the World Music Award for the best-selling album in the Middle East for 2001.

Commercial performance
After the great success of Tamally Maak in 2000, the album Aktar Wahed achieved the highest sales in the history of singing in the Middle East and North Africa, where its sales reached 11 million copies.

Track listing 
Wala Ala Balo (He doesn't know)
Aktar Wahed (The most one)
Kan Tayeb (He was good)
Baed El layali (I count the nights)
Kolt Aih (What did you say)
Wala Lila (Not a night)
Adeni Regeatelk (Take me i'm back)
Sadakny Khalas (Believe me)
Ahebek Akrahek (I love you, I hate you)
Ya Habiby La (Oh my love no)

Covers of some songs 

 The Serbian singer Jami, in her 2004 album, released a song entitled "One stvari", which is a Serbian cover version of Diab's "Wala ala baloh". One year later, the Uzbek singer Yodgor Mirjazajonov released an Uzbek language version of the same song entitled "Gózalim".

References

2001 albums
Amr Diab albums